Antoine Nguyễn Văn Thiện (13 March 1906 – 13 May 2012) was a Vietnamese Roman Catholic bishop and the oldest of the Catholic Church at 106 years of age. He was also one of the last living bishops to have served in South Vietnam.

Born in Cái Cồn, Thiện was ordained a priest on 20 February 1932. He was appointed the bishop of Vĩnh Long in November 1960 and received episcopal consecration in January 1961. He resigned that position in 1968 and was appointed a titular bishop of Hispellum the same month. He became the oldest living Roman Catholic bishop on 6 October 2005, with the death of Bishop Ettore Cunial at age 99.

Thiện died in Nice, France, on 13 May 2012, aged 106. France's Géry Leuliet then became the oldest living Catholic bishop.

References

Sources
 "Bishop saved from rebels", Spokane Daily Chronicle, 9 November 1961

1906 births
2012 deaths
20th-century Roman Catholic bishops in Vietnam
Men centenarians
Participants in the Second Vatican Council
People from Ho Chi Minh City
People of French Indochina
Vietnamese centenarians
Vietnamese expatriates in France